Kencha is a 2009 Indian Kannada-language film directed by P N Sathya, starring
Prajwal Devaraj  and  Pragna  in lead roles.

Cast

 Prajwal Devaraj as Rahul 
 Pragna as Swetha 
 Sharath Lohitashwa as Pashupathy 
 Lakshman
 Tilak Shekar as Ajay

Music

Reception

Critical response 

The New Indian Express wrote "the director introduces a flashback scene and explains that Rahul is the son of Pashupathy and under what circumstances they got separated. The climax is how Rahul teaches Ajay a lesson. It is unfortunate that music director Rajesh Ramanathan has also failed in his assignment. All in all, a film that you can do without". RG Vijayasathy of Rediff.com scored the film at 1.5 out of 5 stars and says "Rajesh Ramanath's music is ordinary. PL.Ravi remains the only technician whose work is worth mentioning. Director Sathya proves that he is a better actor than a writer-director as you need a lot of patience to watch Kencha". B S Srivani of Deccan Herald wrote "Lohitashwa is good, Satya narcissistic and Tilak, the less said the better. Rajesh Ramnath’s tunes and some worthless lyrics compete for the major irritant spot. Camerawork is ok.This ‘Kencha’ will definitely have people expecting some value for their money, see red".

References

2000s Kannada-language films
2009 films